The Backyardigans is a CGI-animated musical TV series created by Janice Burgess. It was written and recorded at Nickelodeon Animation Studio. The series first previewed on the Canadian network Treehouse TV with the episode "Pirate Treasure" on September 11, 2004. Its official debut on Nickelodeon's Nick Jr. block followed on October 11, 2004. The fourth season wrapped production in 2010 and finished airing on Nick Jr. on July 12, 2013.

The series was based upon a live-action pilot called Me and My Friends, which was filmed in 1998 at Nickelodeon Studios Florida.  The episodes are listed below as ordered in the complete series collection on iTunes, DVD releases, and other digital services.

Series overview

Episodes

Pilots (1998–2001)

Season 1 (2004–2006)

Season 2 (2006–2008)

Season 3 (2008–2009)

Season 4 (2009–2013)

References

External links 
Official website
The Backyardigans episode guide at About.com
 

Lists of American children's animated television series episodes
Lists of Canadian children's animated television series episodes
Lists of Nickelodeon television series episodes